The kizlar agha, formally the agha of the House of Felicity, was the head of the eunuchs who guarded the imperial harem of the Ottoman sultans in Constantinople.

Established in 1574, the post ranked among the most important in the Ottoman Empire until the early 19th century, especially after the stewardship of the two holy cities of Mecca and Medina and the supervision of all charitable foundations (vakifs) in the Empire came under his purview. The wealth thus amassed, the proximity to the sultan, and the role the harem ladies played in court intrigues ("Sultanate of Women") meant that its occupant had considerable political influence; several kizlar aghas were responsible for the downfall of grand viziers and the accession of sultans. Soon after its creation and until its abolition, close to the end of the Ottoman Empire, the post came to be occupied by Black African eunuch slaves, and hence is also referred to as the Chief Black Eunuch.

History 

The post of the kizlar agha was created in the reign of Murad III in 1574, with the Habeshi Mehmed Agha as its first occupant. Until then, the Ottoman palace had been dominated by the white eunuchs, chiefly drawn from the Christian populations of the Balkans or the Caucasus. The 16th century, however, saw a rapid rise of the population of the Topkapi Palace, including among eunuchs, whose numbers rose from 40 under Selim I to over a thousand under Murad III. While black eunuchs had served alongside white eunuchs in the palace, by 1592, for reasons that are unclear, both a separation of roles as well as the ascendancy of the black eunuchs over the white ones had become established: white eunuchs were restricted to the supervision of the male pages (içoğlan), while black eunuchs took over the far more prestigious supervision of the private apartments of the sultan and the palace women (harem). Consequently, the "chief black eunuch" quickly eclipsed the "chief white eunuch" or kapi agha (kapı ağası, "agha of the gate"), who had hitherto been the head of the palace personnel, and rose to become, in the words of the Orientalist C. E. Bosworth, "in practice the principal officer of the whole palace". At the height of the post's power in the 17th and 18th centuries, the kizlar agha was a vizier of the first rank ("with three horsetails") and came third in the state hierarchy, next only to the Empire's chief minister, the grand vizier, and the chief religious authority, the sheikh ul-Islam.

Court Responsibilities 
The post's power derived not only from its proximity to the sultan, but also from its association with the mothers of the sultans, the powerful valide sultanas, who often dominated politics (the so-called "Sultanate of Women" period). The kizlar agha was also the de facto sole intermediary between the closed world of the harem and the outer, male quarters of the palace (the selamlik), controlling its provisioning as well as the messages to and from. In addition, he was the only individual allowed to carry the grand vizier's communications to the sultan and had a recognized role in public ceremonies. Among his duties in the palace was also the supervision of the education of imperial princes until they entered puberty, when they were enrolled in the palace school.

The Harem and the Chief Black Eunuch 
Within the imperial harem, it is unclear why East Africans were predominantly recruited as opposed to eunuchs of Caucasian and Hungarian lineage. It is argued that since the male harem already consisted of white eunuchs prior to the establishment of the female harem, combined with the heavy ingress of Habeşi slaves upon said harem's establishment in Topkapi Palace, the black eunuchs assigned to the court would naturally fill this newly established role. These elite black slaves were selected for the sultan by Egyptian Pasha and Mamluk beys.

Another reason for the use of black eunuchs is believed to be the cultural and geographical differences between the Kizlar agha and the harem he guarded. The rationale being that it would help to mitigate sexual contact between guardians and the harem. Jane Hathaway, a researcher specializing in Ottoman history also posits that these displaced elite slaves were preferred over free subjects due to concerns about free subject's loyalty - the East African slave's dependence on their new rulers and lack of familial ties would ensure that no regional bias was present.

Most Kizlar Agha did not remain in service of the harem up to their deaths. They would be dismissed and exiled to Cairo, removed from central political influence. Although removed from the harem of the Ottoman capitol, an exiled Kizlar Agha would still maintain influence as they joined a network of other previously exiled Kizlar agha whom the new acting Kizlar agha would be aware of.

Political Influence of the Kizlar Agha 
In Ottoman legal theory, the sultan was supposed to conduct affairs of state exclusively via the grand vizier, but in reality this arrangement was often circumvented. As the Ottomanist Colin Imber writes, the sultan "had closer contact with the pages of the privy chamber, the agha of the gate, the agha of the girls or with other courtiers than he did with the grand vizier, and these too could petition the sultan on their own or somebody else’s behalf. He might, too, be more inclined to take the advice of his mother, a concubine or the head gardener at the helm of the royal barge than of the grand vizier". Thus the kizlar agha's political power, although exercised behind the scenes, was very considerable, influencing imperial policy and at times controlling the appointments to the grand vizierate, or even intervening in dynastic disputes and the succession to the throne. The Kizlar Agha Hacı Mustafa Agha secured the succession of Mustafa I on the throne in 1617, and backed Osman II's attempts at military reform; while in 1651 the Kizlar Agha Uzun Süleyman Agha murdered the powerful Valide Sultan Kösem on behalf of her rival and daughter-in-law, Turhan.

The often pernicious involvement of the chief black eunuchs in politics led to at least one attempt, by Grand Vizier Silahdar Damat Ali Pasha in 1715, to curb their influence by prohibiting the recruitment and castration of black slaves, but this was never carried out due to his death soon after. Indeed, the long tenure of Hacı Beshir Agha that followed in 1717–1746 is recognized as perhaps the apogee of the post's power and influence. Beshir Agha was a notable patron of the "Tulip Era" culture then flourishing in the empire, being was engaged in "intellectual and religious pursuits" that according to historian Jateen Lad "contributed to the Ottoman brand of Hanafi Islam and Sunni orthodoxy in general". After the downfall of Sultan Ahmed III in 1730, his influence was such that he was responsible for the elevation of grand viziers and the direction of foreign affairs. In 1731, Grand Vizier Kabakulak Ibrahim Pasha tried to force Beshir's retirement to stop him from interfering in state affairs, but through the influence of the valide sultan, Beshir secured Ibrahim's dismissal instead. Beshir died in 1747 at an advanced age. His successor, also called Beshir, was executed in 1752.

After that, the grand viziers curtailed the kizlar aghas' power. The 1830s reforms of Sultan Mahmud II finally ended the political power of the kizlar aghas, and those who held the role were confined to their palace and ceremonial role, which continued until the abolition of the office following the Young Turk Revolution in 1908.

Administration of the vakifs 

The kizlar agha also held a special role as the administrator (nazir) of the charitable foundations and endowments (vakifs) designated for the upkeep of the two holy cities (al-Haramayn) of Islam, Mecca and Medina, being responsible for their supply as well as for the annual ritual sending of gifts (sürre) to them. Vakifs designated for the upkeep of the Muslim holy places had been established by members of the Ottoman court since early times, and their administration entrusted to special departments already since the late 15th century. Initially under the overall supervision of the Kapi Agha, in 1586 Murad III transferred the responsibility to the kizlar agha.

Control of the vakifs was, in the words of Bernard Lewis, a major "source of power and profit" for the kizlar agha, and the foundation of the office's political influence: its conferment by Murad III marked the start of the office's ascendancy, and its eventual removal by Mahmud II marked its end. As part off the grand viziers' attempts to lessen the power of the kizlar aghas, unsuccessful attempts were made in the reigns of Mustafa III and Abdul Hamid I to remove the vakifs from his jurisdiction. Finally, in 1834, Mahmud II deprived the post of the supervision of the vakifs and granted it to a new Ministry of Vakifs.

This began a long process whereby the kizlar agha gradually acquired a sweeping jurisdiction over the various vakifs of the Empire: already in May 1598, he acquired control of the foundations allocated to the upkeep of the imperial mosques in the capital, followed soon after by vakifs in both Constantinople and other parts of the Empire, often entrusted to his care by the ladies of the palace. Among the possessions that fell to the kizlar agha in this way was the city of Athens. According to a—possibly semi-fictional—17th-century account, the administration of the city was originally granted to Basilica, one of Sultan Ahmed I's favourite concubines, who hailed from the city and who, having received many complaints of its maladministration, obtained its possession as a gift from the sultan. After her death, Athens came under the purview of the kizlar agha.

The administration of the vakifs was exercised through two subordinates, the chief secretary (yazici)  and the inspector of vakifs (müfettiş), and was divided into two fiscal departments: the Bureau of Accounts of the Holy Cities (muhasebe-i haremeyn kalemi), which by the late 18th century supervised the imperial mosques and the vakifs of Istanbul and European provinces, and the  Bureau of the Leases of the Holy Cities (mukataa-i haremeyn kalemi), which supervised the vakifs of the Asian and African provinces. A special treasury, the haremeyn dolabi, contained the revenue from the vakifs, and the kizlar agha held a weekly council (divan) to examine the accounts.

Recruitment and advancement 

Most of the office's holders, like most black eunuchs in general, were of Habeşi, slaves were traditionally drawn from the Nilotic groups inhabiting Ethiopia's southern hinterland as well as Omotic groups. Black slaves, usually purchased as boys from Nubia, then castrated and inducted into the palace service, had begun to be employed as the guards of the women of the sultan's harem since the time of Murad III's predecessor, Selim II, and continued to be so employed until the Ottoman Empire's end.  Since İslam religion was against the castration, the slaves preferred were castrated boys from  Coptic Christians,Jews of Sudan and Egyptian extract . Also the people who castrated due to their crimes were accepted in this job as well. The eunuchs usually received flower names, and after a period of training in the palace school, they entered service in the harem. The eunuchs began at the post of ordinary recruit (en aşağı, literally "the lowest", and acemi ağa, "the untrained"), and gradually advanced through the ranks, from nevbet kalfa ("watch substitute") to senior posts in the guard of the harem. Having completed their training and after a period of service, some were detached from guard duties and transferred to the attendance of the inhabitants of the harem: the sultan's personal attendants (müsahip ağaları), the seven eunuch servants plus a head eunuch (baş ağa) attached to each valide, principal wife (kadın), or prince (şehzade), the eunuch imams who led harem prayers, the harem's treasurer (haznedar ağası), or the müsendereci, who supervised the work of the other eunuchs. The senior-most eunuchs were known as hasıllı, from an Arabic word meaning "product".

From these senior posts a eunuch could be selected and appointed to the post of kizlar agha by imperial decree (hatt-ı hümayun) and the ceremonial receipt of a robe of office (hil'at) from the sultan. Alongside the lands belonging to the office, the kizlar agha usually received a personal fief (hass). In the Topkapi Palace, the kizlar agha had his own spacious apartment near the Aviary Gate, while the other eunuchs under his supervision lived together in cramped and rather squalid conditions in a three-storey barracks. When they were dismissed, the chief black eunuchs received a pension (asatlık, literally "document of liberty") and from 1644 on were exiled to Egypt or the Hejaz. Starting in the late 17th century, many former holders were appointed to head the eunuchs who guarded the Tomb of Muhammad in Medina. As a result, serving kizlar aghas often took care to prepare for a comfortable retirement in Egypt by buying property and establishing vakifs of their own there. Thus they became local grandees and were involved in patronizing trade and agriculture. Thus, and given the important role Egypt played in the provisioning of the two holy cities, for which the kizlar aghas were particularly responsible while in office, the aghas and their agents (wakils) came to play a very important role in the economy of Egypt under Ottoman rule.

The careers of a great number of kizlar aghas are known from the Hamiletü’l-kübera of the late 18th-century Ottoman statesman and historian Ahmed Resmî Efendi, listing the occupants of the office from Mehmed Agha (1574–90) until Moralı Beshir Agha (1746–52). The work is complemented by select biographies in the Sicill-i Osmani by the late 19th-century scholar Mehmed Süreyya Bey, while information on the history and evolution of the office in the institutional framework of the Ottoman palace is contained in Tayyarzade Ahmed Ata's Tarih-i Ata (1876).

References

Sources 

 
 
 
 
 
 
 
 
 
 
 

Al-Abdin, B. (2009). The Political and Administrative Role of the Kizlar a ghas in Egypt During the first Half of the twelfth Century AH (AD 1687–1737), in Contemporary Arabic Manuscript Sources.
Hathaway, Jane. (1992). The Role of the Kizlar Aǧasi in 17th-18th Century Ottoman Egypt. Studia Islamica, (75), 141–158. doi:10.2307/1595624

Further reading 
 

Ottoman imperial harem
Ottoman culture
Slaves from the Ottoman Empire
Eunuchs from the Ottoman Empire
African slave trade
Ottoman Egypt
Ottoman titles
Turkish words and phrases